The 1929 Wansbeck by-election was a by-election held on 13 February 1929 for the British House of Commons constituency of Wansbeck.

Vacancy
The by-election was triggered by the death the constituency's Labour Party Member of Parliament (MP) George Warne, who had held the seat since the 1922 general election.

Candidates
The local Liberal association had selected 39 year-old Harry Anson Briggs as their prospective candidate in 1928. Briggs had stood for the Liberals in the 1923 general election at Sheffield Attercliffe and in the 1924 general election at Buckrose. He was educated at Sheffield Secondary School and Sheffield University. He saw active service from 1914-18 in France and Belgium.

Result
The result was a victory for the Labour candidate George Shield, who held the seat with a greatly increased majority. 

Warne was re-elected at the general election in May 1929.

References

See also 
 Wansbeck constituency
 1940 Wansbeck by-election
1918 Wansbeck by-election
 List of United Kingdom by-elections (1918–1931)

1929 elections in the United Kingdom
1929 in England
20th century in Northumberland
By-elections to the Parliament of the United Kingdom in Northumberland constituencies